"Don't Say Goodbye" is a song by Human Nature, released as the fourth single from their album Telling Everybody on 9 March 1997 by Sony Music Records and Columbia Records. It nominated the 1997 ARIA Music Award for Highest Selling Single along with Wishes but lost to Savage Garden's Truly Madly Deeply. The song peaked at No. 8 in Australia, becoming their second top ten single.

Track listing

Australian CD single
 "Don't Say Goodbye" – 4:22
 "Wishes" (Ak's Comfort Zone Mix) – 4:53
 "September Girl" (US Acoustic Remix) – 3:51

 Barcode: 9399700031874

Australian remix single
 "Don't Say Goodbye"
 "Don't Say Goodbye" (Pee Wee Ferris Remix (Radio Edit))
 "Don't Say Goodbye" (Pee Wee Ferris Remix)
 "September Girl" (US acoustic remix)

 Barcode: 9399700036213

Charts

Weekly charts
"Don't Say Goodbye" debuted at No. 10 in Australia in the week commencing March 16, 1997, peaking at No. 8 on April 20, 1997.

Year-end charts

Sales and certifications

Awards
"Don't Say Goodbye" was nominated for an ARIA Music Award at the 1997 ceremony. It lost to "Truly Madly Deeply" by Savage Garden.

|-
|1997
| "Don't Say Goodbye"
|Highest Selling Single
| 
|-
|}

References

1997 singles
Human Nature (band) songs
1996 songs
Columbia Records singles
Songs written by Paul Begaud
Songs written by Andrew Tierney
Songs written by Michael Tierney (musician)
Pop ballads